The Church of St Mary the Virgin in Barrington, Somerset, England dates from the 13th century and has been designated as a Grade I listed building.

St Mary's Church has a three bay nave two bay chancel. There is an unusual octagonal tower, which includes a bell dating from 1743 and made by Thomas Bilbie of the Bilbie family.

The south transept includes a 13th-century canopied piscina. There is a 19th-century panelled pulpit which may contain fragments of an earlier construction.

The parish is part of the benefice of Winsmoor within the deanery of Crewkerne and Ilminster.

See also

 Grade I listed buildings in South Somerset
 List of Somerset towers
 List of ecclesiastical parishes in the Diocese of Bath and Wells

References

13th-century church buildings in England
Church of England church buildings in South Somerset
Grade I listed churches in Somerset
Grade I listed buildings in South Somerset